Ekaterina Kozhokina (born 27 April 1983) is a Russian retired tennis player.

She has a career-high singles ranking by the WTA of 264, reached on 19 March 2001. Kozhokina also has a career-high doubles ranking of world No. 170, achieved on 8 July 2002. Kozhokina won four singles titles and six doubles titles on tournaments of the ITF Circuit.

Kozhokina made her WTA Tour main-draw debut at the 2003 Kremlin Cup in the doubles event, partnering Maria Kondratieva.

ITF finals

Singles (4–3)

Doubles (6–12)

References

External links
 
 

1983 births
Living people
Russian female tennis players
Tennis players from Moscow
20th-century Russian women
21st-century Russian women